The 1908 World Allround Speed Skating Championships took place at 8 and 9 February 1908 at the ice rink Eisstadion in Davos, Switzerland.
THis year it was the first time also Silver and Bronze medals were awarded. Also a point system was introduced to make a ranking, but the rule that if one won three distances became automatic World champion was still valid.

There was no defending champion.
Oscar Mathisen won three distances and became World champion. He also had the lowest number of points awarded.

Allround results 

  * = Fell
 NC = Not classified
 NF = Not finished
 NS = Not started
 DQ = Disqualified
Source: SpeedSkatingStats.com

Rules 
Four distances have to be skated:
 500m
 1500m
 5000m
 10000m

The ranking was made by award ranking points. The points were awarded to the skaters who had skated all the distances. The final ranking was then decided by ordering the skaters by lowest point totals.
 1 point for 1st place
 2 point for 2nd place
 3 point for 3rd place
 and so on

One could win the World Championships also by winning at least three of the four distances, so the ranking could be affected by this.

Silver and bronze medals were awarded.

References 

World Allround Speed Skating Championships, 1908
1908 World Allround
World Allround, 1908
Sport in Davos
February 1908 sports events
1908 in Swiss sport